En Iniya Thozhiye  ( 'My dear and cordial friend') is an Indian Tamil-language soap opera that aired Monday through Friday on Raj TV from 10 November 2014 to 26 February 2016 at 9PM IST for 578 episodes.

The show starred Srithika, Apsar, Ekavalli and Jeyaram. It was produced by produced by Sri Barati Associate and directed by Gopi.R. It also airs in Sri Lanka Tamil Channel on Nethra TV and In Canada Tamil Channel on Tamil Entertainment Television.

Plot
En Iniya Thozhiye is a story about two woman from extreme status of the society, where the rich woman hates love and the woman from middle class background praises love. Love, immaterial to the place it belongs, can be found beautiful, which forms the crux of their marriage.

Cast

Main cast

 Reshma Pasupuleti  and Srithika as Pari Sathya (Sathya's wife, Ekavalli's friend)
 Aravind and Apsar as Sathya (Pari's husband, Prasana's friend)
 Apsara and Ekavalli as Sandhya Prasana (Prasana's wife, Pari's friend)
 Jeyaram as Prasana (Ekavalli's husband, Sathya's friend)

Additional cast
 
 Meenakshi
 Shilpa
 Kiruthika
 Kannan
 Ravivarma
 Vijayalakshmi
 Ramya
 P.Gopalan
 A.Ravikumar

Former cast
 
 Reshma Pasupuleti as Pari 
 Guru Aravind as Sathya
 Apsara as Sandhya
 Nalini

References

External links
 Raj TV Official Site 
 Raj Television Network
 Raj TV on Youtube

Raj TV television series
2014 Tamil-language television series debuts
2010s Tamil-language television series
Tamil-language television shows
2016 Tamil-language television series endings